As the number of German troops committed to the North African Campaign of World War II grew from the initial commitment of a small corps, the Germans developed a more elaborate command structure and placed the enlarged Afrika Korps, with Italian units under this new German command and a succession of commands were created to manage Axis forces in Africa:
 Panzer Group Africa, August 1941 – January 1942; German-Italian force
 Panzer Army Africa,  January–October 1942
 German-Italian Panzer Army, October 1942 – February 1943
 Army Group Africa, February–May 1943

History

Panzer Group Africa
In the middle of 1941 Oberkommando der Wehrmacht (OKW, Armed Forces High Command) created a larger command structure in Africa, forming a new headquarters, Panzer Group Africa. On 15 August 1941, Panzer Group Africa was activated with newly promoted  Erwin Rommel in command.

Panzer Army Africa
Panzer Group Africa was renamed Panzer Army Africa on 30 January 1942. (A German Panzer group was an army-level headquarters. As the war progressed all of the Panzer groups were renamed Panzer Armies.)

German-Italian Panzer Army
Panzer Army Africa was renamed German-Italian Panzer Army in October 1942 during the long retreat after the defeat at the Second Battle of El Alamein during the Western Desert Campaign.

Army Group Africa
In February 1943, the headquarters was expanded and called Army Group Africa''' to manage the defence of Tunisia during the final stages of the North African Campaign. Army Group Africa included the German Fifth Panzer Army and the Italian 1st Army. Command of the Army Group was turned over from Rommel to Hans-Jürgen von Arnim in March. He surrendered the Army Group on 13 May 1943, ending the Axis presence in Africa.

Order of battle
The following overview of its components is taken from lexikon-der-wehrmacht de, with dates corrected (see references).

Panzer Group Africa (Rommel)
 As of September 1941: (during Rommel's first push into the Western Desert)
 
 X Army Corps
 XX Army Corps
 55th Infantry Division "Savona"

Panzer Army Africa (Rommel)
 As of January 1942: (during Rommel's second push into the Western Desert)
 
 X Army Corps
 XX Army Corps
 XXI Corpo
 90th Leichte Afrika Division
 55th Infantry Division "Savona"
 As of April 1942: (before and during the Gazala battles and the Siege of Tobruk)
 
 X Army Corps
 XX Army Corps
 XXI Army Corps
 German 90th Leichte Afrika Division
 As of August 1942: (in the lead up to the Battle of Alam el Halfa)
 
 X Army Corps
 XX Army Corps
 XXI Army Corps
 133rd Armored Division "Littorio"

German-Italian Panzer Army (Rommel)
 As of November 1942: (during the withdrawal from the Western Desert)
 
 X Army Corps
 XX Army Corps
 XXI Army Corps
 German 90th Leichte Afrika'' Division
 17th Infantry Division "Pavia"
 136th Armored Division "Giovani Fascisti"
 February 1943: (defending southern Tunisia)
 
 XX Army Corps
 XXI Army Corps
 German 164th Light Division
 German Ramcke Parachute Brigade

Army Group Africa
From February 1943:
 German 5th Panzer Army (Northern Tunisia)
 Division Hermann Göring
 Division von Manteuffel
 10th Panzer Division 
 334th Infantry Division
 999th Light Division
 Italian 1st Infantry Division "Superga"
 Italian 1st Army (Southern Tunisia)
 16th Motorized Division "Pistoia"
 101st Motorized Division "Trieste"
 131st Armored Division "Centauro"
 136th Armored Division "Giovani Fascisti"
 German 15th Panzer Division
 German 21st Panzer Division
 German 90th Light Division
 German 164th Light Division

Commanders

See also
 List of World War II military units of Germany
 List of Italian divisions in World War II
 Panzer Division
 
 Hans von Luck

Footnotes

North African campaign
Western Desert campaign
German units in Africa
PA
Military units and formations established in 1941
Military units and formations disestablished in 1943
Army groups of the German Army in World War II